"Promised Land" is the third album of Japanese singer-songwriter Rurutia. It
reached No. 111 on Oricon and charted for a week.

Track listing
 
 neo
 
 
 
  
  
 
 GOLA
  
 maururu roa

Promised Land
Rurutia albums